Francisco Javier Mayorga Castañeda (born 17 April 1951) is a Mexican businessman and politician who served as Secretary of Agriculture in the cabinet of President Felipe Calderón from 7 September 2009 to November 30, 2012. He had previously served in the same post from 28 September 2005 to 30 November 2006 in the administration of President Vicente Fox.

Early years

Mayorga was born in Guadalajara, Jalisco into a family of eight brothers devoted to grain trade in the Western part of the country. He graduated with a bachelor's degree in Economics from the Autonomous Institute of Technology of Mexico (ITAM) and completed a master's degree in Business Administration at the Monterrey Institute of Technology (ITESM) before presiding several business chambers in his native state.

As Secretary of Agriculture

Mayorga was appointed Secretary of Agriculture for the first time in the administration of President Vicente Fox. His second appointment, in the cabinet of Felipe Calderón, was criticised by Greenpeace for his alleged continuous support to genetically modified food trading within the country.

References

Mexican businesspeople
National Action Party (Mexico) politicians
Instituto Tecnológico Autónomo de México alumni
Monterrey Institute of Technology and Higher Education alumni
Politicians from Guadalajara, Jalisco
1951 births
Living people